Club Baloncesto Las Rozas is a basketball team based in Las Rozas de Madrid, Spain. It was founded in 1987. In July 2011, the team achivied one of the vacant berths in LEB Plata.

Season by season

Women's team
CB Las Rozas has also a women's team who plays at Liga Femenina 2 since 2011.

References

External links
Official website

Basketball teams in the Community of Madrid
Former LEB Plata teams
Former Liga EBA teams
Las Rozas de Madrid